This is an article about the actress. For the American eco artist and author, see Deborah Kennedy (artist).
Deborah Kennedy is an Australian character actress recognised for several television and film roles, especially for her appearance in the famous Australian Yellow Pages advertisement with the line "Not happy, Jan!".

Career
Kennedy began her acting career on the stage, with the Marian Street Theatre, Killara, appearing in The Trojan Woman and Macbeth. She followed this with work with several other theatrical organisations including SUDS, Repertory 200, the New Theatre, and the Pegeant Theatre. For the Nimrod theatre starting in 1975 she had several roles in plays, acting in Much Ado About Nothing and Richard III. Other theatre work includes Travelling North, House of the Deaf Man, Accidental Death of an Anarchist, Desert Flambe.

Starting in the 1970s she also acted in various television roles, with appearances in Certain Women, Silent Number, Waygoose, Doctor Down Under, The Restless Years, Bellamy, 1915 (miniseries). Film roles of the period include Tim (1979) which starred Mel Gibson and Piper Laurie, Dawn! (1979), Temperament Unsuited.

In the 1980s she played a brief guest role in soap opera Prisoner, and in 1991 was a regular cast member of serial Chances. She continued in that role several months until her character, nurse Connie Reynolds, was written out of the show as part of a cast revamp. In the 1990s continued television guest appearances included a recurring part in Police Rescue and roles in series Wildside and Good Guys Bad Guys. She continued to play supporting roles in feature films, including I Can't Get Started (1985), The Empty Beach (1985), Death in Brunswick (1991), The Sum of Us (1994), Idiot Box (1996), Thank God He Met Lizzie (1997), My Mother Frank (2000), Matter of Life (2001), Swimming Upstream (2003). She also appeared in two children's programs, Johnson and Friends and Boffins.

Kennedy also delivered the famous (in Australia) catch-phrase "Not happy, Jan!" in the oft-quoted TV commercial for the Yellow Pages telephone directory. In the 2000s television guest roles have included appearances series MacLeod's Daughters and Welcher & Welcher. Starting 2006, Kennedy appeared in a recurring role in the soap opera Neighbours as Mishka Schneiderova, Lou Carpenter's Russian partner whom he met online. After completing a stint in the series Mishka made her on-air return in Australia in October 2006. Kennedy appeared in the comedy series The Jesters in 2009 and has had guest roles on television series Dance Academy, Rake, and Miss Fisher's Murder Mysteries.  Since 2013 Kennedy has been a regular cast member in the Australian period drama A Place to Call Home playing the role of Inverness local gossip who means well, Doris Collins. Kennedy also had a brief role in the first series of the ABC's Janet King.

Filmography

FILM

TELEVISION

External links

Notes

Australian stage actresses
Australian television actresses
Australian film actresses
Living people
Year of birth missing (living people)